Lindzay Chan is a former chief dancer of the Hong Kong Ballet, and an actress in the Hong Kong cinema and theatre.

chan born in Hong Kong, her ancestral hometown is wenchang county, Hainan province. 

Chan's grandfather was Chan Chak, an admiral of the Republic of China Navy.

As a long working partner of Hong Kong film director Evans Chan, she was named Best Actress at the Golden Horse Film Festival for her performance in To Liv(e) (1992) for the role of Rubie, who writes a letter to Norwegian actress Liv Ullmann against her criticism of Hong Kong's policy in expelling Vietnamese boat people.

Filmography
 Datong: The Great Society (2011)

References

External links  

 

20th-century Hong Kong actresses
21st-century Hong Kong actresses
Living people
Year of birth missing (living people)